Abaris splendidula is a species of woodland ground beetle in the family Carabidae. It is found in Baja California as well as Arizona and Mexico. It lives in cool and dry habitats.

References

Further reading

 
 
 

Harpalinae
Beetles described in 1863
Taxa named by John Lawrence LeConte